James Milton Eidson (born May 10, 1954) is a former American football Offensive guard in the National Football League for the Dallas Cowboys. He played college football at Mississippi State University.

Early years
Eidson attended Morgan County High School (now Hartselle), where he practiced football, golf, shot put and the discus throw. In football, he was a two-way player at tackle.

He accepted a football scholarship from Mississippi State University. He was a defensive tackle, but was demoted from starter to the scout team as a sophomore.

In 1974, he was converted into an offensive tackle when head coach Bob Tyler installed the veer offense. He started 22 consecutive games at right tackle, receiving honorable-mention All-SEC honors in 1975.

In 2009, he was inducted into the Morgan County Hall of Fame.

Professional career
Eidson was selected by the Dallas Cowboys in the second round (55th Overall) of the 1976 NFL Draft, with the intention of switching him to offensive guard. As a rookie, he was a backup guard and center, playing  in 9 games and was a part of the Super Bowl XII championship team.

In 1977, he suffered a jammed neck during a training camp blocking drill against defensive end Ed "Too Tall" Jones and experienced temporary paralysis. In the preseason, he also had a knee injury against the Houston Oilers that placed him on the injured reserve list. In 1978, he suffered a second sprained neck injury in preseason and was diagnosed with a spinal cord condition, which forced him into early retirement.

Personal life
Eidson married Jana Beth Scoggins in 1979 and they have three children: Taylor, Grant, and Savannah. Eidson went on to earn his MBA from Southern Methodist University's Cox School of Business and was elected to Beta Gamma Sigma honor society. He became the president of Precedent Equities LLC, a real estate company in Dallas, Texas.

References

External links
Eidson's path took him to Super Bowl

1954 births
Living people
People from Hartselle, Alabama
Players of American football from Alabama
American football offensive guards
Mississippi State Bulldogs football players
Dallas Cowboys players